

Belgium
 Congo Free State 
 Francis Walter de Winton, Administrator-General of the Congo Free State (1884–1886)
 Camille Janssen, Administrator-General of the Congo Free State (1886–1891)

France
 Obock and Tadjoura – Léonce Lagarde, Commandant of Obock and Tadjoura (1884–1887)
 Riviéres du Sud – Jean-Marie Bayol, Lieutenant-Governor of Riviéres du Sud (1882–1891)

Portugal
 Angola – 
 Francisco Joaquim Ferreira do Amaral, Governor-General of Angola (1882–1886)
 Gilherme Auguste de Brito Capelo, Governor-General of Angola (1886–1892)

United Kingdom
 Malta Colony – Lintorn Simmons, Governor of Malta (1884–1888)
 New South Wales – Charles Wynn-Carington, Lord Lincolnshire, Governor of New South Wales (1885–1890)
 Queensland – Sir Anthony Musgrave, Governor of Queensland (1883–1888)
 Tasmania – Major George Strahan, Governor of Tasmania (1881–1886)
 South Australia – Sir William Robinson, Governor of SouthAustralia (1883–1889)
 Victoria – Henry, Lord Loch, Governor of Victoria (1884–1889)
 Western Australia – Sir Frederick Broome, Governor of Western Australia (1883–1890)

Colonial governors
Colonial governors
1886